Serena Williams won the title by defeating Jennifer Capriati 6–2, 4–6, 6–4 in the final.

Seeds
The first four seeds received a bye into the second round.

Draw

Finals

Top half

Bottom half

References
 Official results archive (ITF)
 Official results archive (WTA)

2002
2002 WTA Tour